The 2010 Avon Tyres British GT season was the 18th season of the British GT Championship. The season began on 5 April at Oulton Park and finished on 16 October at Donington Park after thirteen races, twelve held in the United Kingdom as well as a single overseas event at Spa-Francorchamps.

Sexagenarian David Ashburn prevailed in the GT3 class, taking his Trackspeed car to the championship title after being helped by three different co-drivers during the season. After sharing his car with Siso Cunill and Richard Westbrook – Westbrook would later return to Trackspeed to boost Ashburn's championship challenge, sharing a car with Philip Walker – in one-off appearances scoring a podium with each, it was a driver 43 years his junior that he enjoyed most success with. Porsche Carrera Cup driver Glynn Geddie had competed with Ashburn at his home event at Knockhill but joined him full-time from the Rockingham meeting onwards, and the pairing took four victories in the last eight races to give Ashburn the championship and Geddie the runner-up spot. Duncan Cameron and Matt Griffin finished in third place, taking three victories during the season. Also taking three victories were defending champions David and Godfrey Jones, who struggled for reliability in their Ascari, finishing only five races all season. Hector Lester and Allan Simonsen, Tom Ferrier and Dan Brown, and Peter Kox and Marc Hayek were the other race winners.

In the G4 class, Christian Dick and Jamie Stanley were comfortable champions, taking five victories during the season as the Speedworks pair finished 32.5 points ahead of their nearest challengers. Rory Butcher and Benjamin Harvey only contested six of the season's thirteen races, but with a win and three second place finishes, amassed enough points to finish as the closest challengers to Dick and Stanley. Nathan Freke and Vibe Smed finished a point further back with seven podium finishes, with many of those coming where only half points were awarded. Brothers Benji and Freddie Hetherington won three of their five starts in the class, having spent most of the season in the Ginetta G50 Cup, Athanasios Ladas and Michael Mallock swept both races at Rockingham, with single victories going to Daniel Lloyd and Julien Draper, as well as another pair of brothers, Matt and Robert Bell. A GT Cup class was held at the first two meetings, with Phil Dryburgh and John Gaw claiming honours in both races at Oulton Park, and Steve Hunter and Derek Pierce taking a victory and a DNF at Knockhill.

Rule changes

Class restructure and new homologations
On 15 October 2009 the SRO Motorsports Group announced changes to the structure of the 2010 season including a wider variety of circuits, with races broadcast on Channel 4 and viewable again on 4oD. The race coverage was also available on Motors TV. It was also announced that emphasis was placed on the avoidance of clashes with other prominent racing series.

For the 2010 season, the GT3 class had more homologated cars available to compete because homologated models of superseded FIA GT3-spec cars were eligible to race along with the Nationally homologated Mosler. Thirteen marques were available to race. They included Ascari, Aston Martin, Audi, BMW Alpina, Chevrolet, Dodge, Ferrari, Ford, Jaguar, Lamborghini, Morgan, Mosler and Porsche.

The G4 class also featured more cars because of the introduction of Supersport-spec cars from last year to the class such as Lotus, KTM and Donkervoort. In addition to the new Supersport cars into the G4 class, most GT4 homologated cars were eligible to race, including Aston Martin, BMW, Chevrolet, Ford, Gillet, Ginetta, Maserati, Nissan, Opel and Porsche.

The Cup class was reintroduced after a two-year absence. In previous years, it gave amateur race drivers the chance to compete in the highest level of GT racing in the UK and it returned due to heavy demand. The cars eligible were the cars currently used in the Porsche Supercup and Ferrari Challenge series, based on the Porsche 997 and Ferrari F430 road cars. It was only held at the first two meetings, with a single car running at each meeting.

Entry list
The provisional entry list for the championship was released on 24 March 2010.

Calendar
 All rounds were 60 minutes in duration, with the exception of the round at Spa-Francorchamps – a 150-minute race held in conjunction with Belcar – as well as the two-hour races at Silverstone and Donington Park. A GT Cup class ran at the first two meetings with Kinfaun Racing winning twice at Oulton Park and Jamie Hunter Racing winning at Knockhill. All races except Belgian round at Spa, were held in the United Kingdom.

Standings
Points were awarded to the top eight finishers in the order 10-8-6-5-4-3-2-1 for 60 minute races, with double points awarded for the endurance races. Half-points were given in certain races of the G4 class, and in all GT Cup races due to a lack of entries. Drivers in bold indicate pole position, while drivers in italics indicate fastest lap.

GT3

G4

GT Cup

References

External links
British GT website

GT
2010